Farid Azarkan (born 16 October 1971) is a Moroccan-born Dutch politician serving as Leader of DENK since 26 September 2020. He has been a member of the House of Representatives since 23 March 2017 and parliamentary leader since 21 March 2020. Azarkan is the lijsttrekker for DENK in the 2021 general election.

Controversies 

In February 2017, it was reported that some members of the youth department of DENK had created fake social media profiles in order to influence public opinion. Tunahan Kuzu acknowledged that there had been some internet trolls and that they would be held to account for their behaviour. Furthermore, Kuzu said that "Farid Azarkan may have given some sort of permission, but that is not entirely clear."

Azarkan has been criticised for designing a banner in the style of the PVV with the image of the populist politician Geert Wilders and the logo of the PVV with the slogan "After March 15, we will purify the Netherlands". According to DENK, the idea behind the campaign would have been to "show how far the PVV can go." Nonetheless, the party management, Selçuk Öztürk and Tunahan Kuzu, decided not to place the advertisement.

References 

1971 births
Living people
21st-century Dutch civil servants
21st-century Dutch politicians
DENK politicians
Dutch Muslims
Leaders of political parties in the Netherlands
Members of the House of Representatives (Netherlands)
Moroccan emigrants to the Netherlands
Vrije Universiteit Amsterdam alumni